"Pretty Green Eyes" is a song originally written and recorded by Force & Styles featuring Junior. A remixed version appeared on their debut album All Over the UK (1996) and the song was released as a 12-inch single in 1997. The song achieved mainstream popularity in 2003 when it was covered by Ultrabeat and peaked at  2 on the UK Singles Chart.

Force & Styles version
The Force & Styles version was a happy hardcore song which features the vocals of Junior, and was played at Simon and Kerry's wedding – Simon being an MC who had previously performed with Force & Styles when they DJ'd at various hardcore club nights. The song was produced by Force & Styles and recorded with Junior at their own 'UK Dance Studios', in Clacton-on-Sea, Essex in 1996.

It first appeared on hardcore compilation albums, and in 1997 it was released on 12-inch vinyl on Force & Styles's own record label UK Dance Records, with a b-side "Apollo 13 [pt II] (The Journey Home)". The vinyl was also re-released in 2001.

This hardcore version, although popular among hardcore listeners, never achieved the same mainstream success as the Ultrabeat cover.

After the death of Junior on 31 December 2011, an online campaign to get the original, hardcore version into the charts was started called "Let's get Junior - Pretty Green Eyes (Force & Styles) to #1".

Track listing
12-inch single
 "Pretty Green Eyes" (feat. Junior) – 6:48
 "Apollo 13 [pt II] (The Journey Home)" – 6:04

Personnel
Force & Styles
 Paul Hobbs – producer
 Darren Mew – producer

Additional musicians
 Junior – vocals

Ultrabeat version

Ultrabeat's members had all been fans of happy hardcore since 1997 and when they decided to record a song, they chose to cover the old Force & Styles song "Pretty Green Eyes".  The group used a recording studio in Liverpool where Mike Di Scala was the engineer, and they first recorded the song there, with Mike singing. During the recording session, they did not have a pop filter for the microphone, so they had to use a sock instead.

The song was signed by All Around the World because of Di Scala's last single for the label under the Rezonance Q alias. "Someday", a cover of the Mariah Carey song, had achieved a peak of No. 29 in the charts and when Di Scala was discussing its success with All Around the World, he played them Ultrabeat's demo of "Pretty Green Eyes". The whistle noise at the start of the song is sampled from House Traffic's 1994 hit "Every Day of My Life".

Release and reception
"Pretty Green Eyes" became more popular when it was released on promos and Clubland III and played more in nightclubs. The song was released as a single on 4 August 2003. It entered the UK Singles Chart at No. 2, behind "Breathe" by Blu Cantrell, and stayed in the chart for 15 weeks. This led to Ultrabeat performing on Top of the Pops and a lock-out signing in the HMV store in Liverpool.

Music video

The video was filmed in London and features three young women who are dancers in a strip club. They are putting on their make-up and outfits, then they dance in the strip club, then the video switches to a nightclub, and back between the two.

Ultrabeat also appear in the video. They are sitting down on chairs in the strip club and they are also DJing at the nightclub. The video makes use of green lighting and green clothes, and switches between locations after zooming in on one of the girl's green eyes.

The original video for "Pretty Green Eyes" was actually a casino scene filmed at the Baby Blue Bar on the Albert Dock in Liverpool, but was not used as the actual music video. The scene depicts a gorgeous girl with green eyes gambling on the dice table. The dice dealer, Bill Pettrey, was the Deputy General Manager of Leo Casino, one of Liverpool's top night spots on Queen's Dock.

Track listings
CD single 1
 "Pretty Green Eyes" (radio edit) – 3:25
 "Pretty Green Eyes" (CJ Stone remix) – 7:52
 "Pretty Green Eyes" (extended radio edit) – 6:55
 "Pretty Green Eyes" (extended club mix) – 7:45

CD single 2
 "Pretty Green Eyes" (CJ Stone edit) – 3:04
 "Pretty Green Eyes" (N-Trance remix) – 6:46
 "Pretty Green Eyes" (Scott Brown remix) – 6:38
 "Pretty Green Eyes" (video)

Maxi-CD single
 "Pretty Green Eyes" (radio edit) – 3:25
 "Pretty Green Eyes" (CJ Stone remix) – 7:52
 "Pretty Green Eyes" (extended radio edit) – 6:55
 "Pretty Green Eyes" (extended club mix) – 7:45
 "Pretty Green Eyes" (N-Trance remix) – 6:46
 "Pretty Green Eyes" (Friday Night Posse remix) – 6:45
 "Pretty Green Eyes" (Scott Brown remix) – 6:38
 "Pretty Green Eyes" (Rezonance Q remix) – 7:05
 "Pretty Green Eyes" (Kenny Hayes remix) – 6:14

12-inch single 1
 "Pretty Green Eyes" (extended radio edit) – 6:55
 "Pretty Green Eyes" (extended club mix) – 7:45
 "Pretty Green Eyes" (CJ Stone remix) – 7:52
 "Pretty Green Eyes" (Flip & Fill remix) – 5:48

12-inch single 2
 "Pretty Green Eyes" (CJ Stone remix) – 7:52
 "Pretty Green Eyes" (extended radio edit) – 6:55
 "Pretty Green Eyes" (extended club mix) – 7:45
 "Pretty Green Eyes" (N-Trance short mix)

Download EP
 "Pretty Green Eyes" (radio edit) – 3:25
 "Pretty Green Eyes" (CJ Stone edit) – 3:04
 "Pretty Green Eyes" (extended radio edit) – 6:55
 "Pretty Green Eyes" (extended club mix) – 7:45
 "Pretty Green Eyes" (CJ Stone remix) – 7:52
 "Pretty Green Eyes" (Kenny Hayes remix) – 8:13
 "Pretty Green Eyes" (Friday Night Posse remix) – 6:45
 "Pretty Green Eyes" (N-Trance remix) – 6:46
 "Pretty Green Eyes" (Flip & Fill remix) – 5:48
 "Pretty Green Eyes" (Chill Out Mix) – 3:25
 "Pretty Green Eyes" (Kenny Hayes edit) – 6:14
 "Pretty Green Eyes" (DJ Lhasa remix) – 4:58
 "Pretty Green Eyes" (DJ Lhasa edit) – 3:22
 "Pretty Green Eyes" (Flip & Fill edit) – 4:54
 "Pretty Green Eyes" (Rezonance Q remix) – 7:05
 "Pretty Green Eyes" (extended club mix) – 7:45
 "Pretty Green Eyes" (extended radio edit) - 6:55
 "Pretty Green Eyes" (Scott Brown remix) – 6:38

Personnel
Ultrabeat
 Mike Di Scala – vocals, producer
 Ian Redman – producer
 Chris Henry – producer

Other personnel
 Ignition – design

Charts and certifications

Weekly charts

Year-end charts

Certifications

References

External links
 Force & Styles featuring Junior – 
 Ultrabeat – 
 Ultrabeat – 

1996 songs
1997 singles
2003 debut singles
Force & Styles songs
Number-one singles in Scotland
Songs written by Darren Styles
Ultrabeat songs